The E. Martin Hennings House and Studio Historic District was the property of Taos, New Mexico artist E. Martin Hennings.  The property includes two contributing buildings and a contributing structure.  It was listed on the National Register of Historic Places in 1990.

References

External links

Houses on the National Register of Historic Places in New Mexico
Taos County, New Mexico
Pueblo Revival architecture in Taos, New Mexico